The 1975–76 Gillette Cup was the second edition of what is now the Regional Super50, the domestic limited-overs cricket competition for the countries of the West Indies Cricket Board (WICB). Sponsored by Gillette, it was the first season of the competition to carry that name.

Six teams participated – Barbados, Guyana, Jamaica, the Leeward Islands, Trinidad and Tobago, and the Windward Islands. The competition was impacted by rain, with only three of the six scheduled group-stage matches being completed. Barbados were eventually joined by Trinidad and Tobago in the final, going on to defeat their opponent by 43 runs to claim their second domestic one-day title. Two Barbadians, Gordon Greenidge and Wayne Daniel, led the tournament in runs and wickets, respectively.

Teams

Group stage

North Zone

South Zone

Final

See also
 1975–76 Shell Shield season

References

1976 in West Indian cricket
West Indian cricket seasons from 1970–71 to 1999–2000
Regional Super50 seasons
Domestic cricket competitions in 1975–76
February 1976 sports events in North America